Hu Xingdou(胡星斗) (born 1962) is a Chinese economist. He is a professor of economics at Beijing Institute of Technology, and is the founder of China Studies (Sinology) as well as various schools and 100 teaching posts and business management to guide the work of graduate students.

References

External links
(Chinese) Official website
(Chinese) Official blog

People's Republic of China economists
Living people
1962 births
Academic staff of Beijing Institute of Technology
Economists from Jiangxi
Educators from Jiangxi
People from Jiujiang
People's Republic of China essayists
Writers from Jiangxi